Imperials Live is a 1978 live album by Christian music vocal group The Imperials, released on DaySpring Records

Imperials Live was recorded at two venues: First Baptist Church in Waco, Texas and at The Kingsland Theatre in St. Louis, Missouri to promote their 1977 album Sail On. There are three songs that were recorded from 1976 that resulted in The Lost Album (2006) that the Imperials performed live for this album: "Sonshiny Day," "New Creation" and "I Love The Way You Love." The album was nominated for a Grammy Award for Best Gospel Performance, Contemporary or Inspirational at the 21st Grammy Awards. Imperials Live has never been released on CD.

Track listing

Personnel

The Imperials
 Russ Taff – lead vocals
 Jim Murray – tenor, vocals
 David Will – baritone, vocals
 Armond Morales – bass, vocals

References

1978 live albums
The Imperials albums
Word Records albums